Emilia is a studio album by Swedish singer Emilia Rydberg released in November 2000. Saleswise, the album became less successful than her previous album.

Track listing
Sorry I'm in Love - 3:04 (A. Carlsson, D. Carr, T. Champlin)
Kiss by Kiss - 4:00 (D. Carr, P. Lönn, A.D. Rich)
Johnny Come Lately - 3:09 (A. Cantrall, S. Selover)
Before I Fall - 3:20 (J. Elofsson, T. Cox)
Girlfriend 2:55 (J. Lindman)
Playin' It By Heart - 3:54 (A. Carlsson, D. Carr, A.D. Rich, A.R. Scott)
If It's Gonna Be You - 3:07 (J. Lindman, E. Rydberg)
What If I Told You... - 3:51 (D. Eriksen, E. Rydberg)
Heaven - 3:36 (B. Adams, J. Vallance)
My Love Is True - 3:14 (D. Carr, P. Lönn, E. Rydberg)
Tell Me Why - 3:55 (M. Pettersen, T. Eriksen)
Say You Will (Or Say You Won't) - 3:52 (P. Söderqvist, N. Windahl, E. Rydberg)
Supergirl - 3:09 (D. Carr, P. Bruhn, E. Rydberg)
Supergirl Outro - 1:06 (D. Carr, P. Bruhn, E. Rydberg)

Contributors
Emilia Rydberg – vocals
Johan Lindman – guitar
Douglas Carr – guitar, keyboards

Charts

References 

2000 albums
Emilia Rydberg albums
Universal Music Group albums